Scott Fitzpatrick (born September 28, 1987) is an American politician serving as the State Auditor of Missouri following the 2022 election. He previously served as Missouri State Treasurer. He represented Missouri's 158th District in the Missouri House of Representatives from January 2013 to January 2019.

In December 2018, Governor Mike Parson appointed fellow-Republican Fitzpatrick to become state treasurer, following the appointment of the previous state treasurer Eric Schmitt as state attorney general effective in January 2019. Fitzpatrick took his new office on January 14, 2019. He was elected to a full term as treasurer in November 2020, defeating former state representative Vicki Englund.

Early life and education
Fitzpatrick was raised in Shell Knob, Missouri and graduated from Cassville High School in 2006. He attended the University of Missouri, graduating in 2010.

Career
Fitzpatrick founded marine products company MariCorp U.S. in 2003, and is its CEO. Initially a marina and dock repair firm, the company grew into regional contracting and national production, centering on the inland commercial marina market, before entering general and government contracting.

Fitzpatrick was first elected to the Missouri House of Representatives in 2012 and served from January 2013, winning reelection in 2014, 2016, and 2018 (where he ran unopposed). He represented Barry, Lawrence, and Stone Counties. In addition to serving as Chairman of the Budget Committee, he also served on the Joint Committee on Legislative Research and Public Assistance. He currently lives in Cassville, Missouri.

After former Attorney General Josh Hawley won the November 2018 election for U.S. Senator, Governor Mike Parson appointed State Treasurer Eric Schmitt as Attorney General in January 2019, creating a vacancy in the Office of State Treasurer. Likewise, on December 19, 2018, Governor Parson subsequently appointed Fitzpatrick to the office of state treasurer. Fitzpatrick assumed office as state treasurer with a swearing-in ceremony on January 14, 2019. Fitzpatrick began campaigning for a full term as state treasurer in November 2019. He defeated three other candidates in the 2020 Missouri State Treasurer election. In July 2021, Fitzpatrick declared his candidacy for the 2022 Missouri State Auditor election. He was the first person to do so after Nicole Galloway stated that she would not run for a second term.

Electoral history

State representative

State Treasurer

State Auditor

References

External links

 

|-

|-

|-

|-

1987 births
High school football players in the United States
Living people
People from Shell Knob, Missouri
Politicians from Springfield, Missouri
Republican Party members of the Missouri House of Representatives
State Auditors of Missouri
State treasurers of Missouri
University of Missouri alumni